Galante is a surname. Notable people with the surname include:

 Galante (pedigree), a family of Jewish scholars which flourished in the Middle Ages
 Abraham ben Mordecai Galante (died 1560), kabalist and author
 Mordecai Galante (died 1781), rabbi of Damascus
 Moses Galante (died 1806), rabbi of Damascus
 Moses Galante (the Elder) (or Moshe ben Mordechai Galante; died 1608), rabbi, disciple of Joseph Caro
 Moses Galante (the Younger) (or Moshe ben Yonatan Galante; 1621-1689), rabbi
 Mordecai Galante (died 1781), Chief rabbi of Damascus and author of Gedullat Mordekai
 Moses Galante (died 1806), chief rabbi of Damascus
 Andrea Galante (born 1982), Argentine actress
 Anyela Galante Salerno (born 1991), Venezuelan model and beauty pageant titleholder 
 Carmine Galante (1910-1979), a member of the Bonanno crime family
 Cecilia (Plummer) Galante, American author 
 Fabio Galante (born 1973), Italian footballer
 Forrest Galante (born 1988), American outdoor adventurer, wildlife biologist, and television personality
 Giuseppe Galante (born 1937), Italian rower
 Inese Galante, Latvian opera singer
 James Galante (born 1953), a member of the Bonanno crime family
 Joe Galante, American music industry executive
 Jose "Pepe" Galante, Argentine winemaker in the Uco Valley, Mendoza
 Joseph Anthony Galante (1938–2019), American Roman Catholic bishop
 Matt Galante (born 1944), American baseball player and manager
 Sala Galante Burton (1925–1987), Polish-born American politician 
 Severino Galante (ca. 1750–1827), Italian painter
 Svetlana Galante (born 1973), Russian judoka and a sambo practitioner
 Theodore Galante  (born 1956), American architect 
 Virginia Galante Garrone (1906-1998), Italian writer
 Given name
 Tiago Daniel Galante Cruz (born 1995), Portuguese futsal player

See also
 6241 Galante, a main-belt asteroid
 Galante music, the period of the 18th century in classical music between the Baroque and Classical periods
 Fête galante, a painting style

Jewish surnames
Sephardic surnames